Machine Gun is an improvising band formed in New York City in 1986. Its members were Robert Musso: guitars, Thomas Chapin: reeds and flute, John Lunar Richey: vocals, cut-ups, tapes, TV, Bil Bryant: drums, Jair-Rohm Parker Wells: basses. Karl Berger played melodica on their first album. Guitarist Sonny Sharrock frequently performed with the band and appeared on their first two albums. The band's name came from Peter Brötzmann's 1968 album Machine Gun.

Members
 Thomas Chapin – flute, saxophone
 Karl Berger – vocals, melodica
 Sonny Sharrock – guitar
 Robert Musso – guitar, tapes
 Jair-Rohm Parker Wells – bass guitar
 Billy Bryant – drums
 John Lunar Richey – vocals, tapes

References

External links
 Dipazon Discography

American jazz ensembles from New York City
Avant-garde jazz ensembles
Free improvisation ensembles
Free improvising musicians
Free jazz ensembles